The Land of Eupen or Eupen Land (Luxembourgish and ,), corresponding to the Canton of Eupen (see Cantons of Belgium), is the northern part of the German-speaking Community of Belgium, lying on the border with Germany. Eupen is the capital of this region. To the south lies the Canton of Sankt Vith, which makes up the rest of the German-speaking Community.

In the Land of Eupen, the spoken languages are German and the dialect Ripuarian, which is also spoken in the neighbouring part of Germany and a couple of municipalities in Dutch Limburg, like Kerkrade and Vaals.

Municipalities in the Land of Eupen
Eupen (with Kettenis)
Kelmis (La Calamine) (with Neu-Moresnet and Hergenrath)
Lontzen (with Herbestal and Walhorn)
Raeren (with Eynatten and Hauset)

See also
 Land of Herve
 Voerstreek
 East Cantons

References

Ardennes
Areas of Belgium
Regions of Wallonia
Geography of Liège Province
German-speaking Community of Belgium
Eupen
Kelmis
Lontzen
Raeren